Agde is a in the département of Hérault in the south of France. Its railway station was opened in 1857 and is on the Bordeaux–Sète line. Its train services are operated by the SNCF. TGV, Intercités and TER Languedoc-Roussillon trains stop at Agde. The station serves the nearby tourist resort of Cap d'Agde.

Train services
Train services depart From Agde station to major French cities such as: Paris, Montpellier, Perpignan, Toulouse, Avignon, and Marseille.

International services operate to Barcelona

The station is served by the following service(s):

High-speed services (TGV) Paris–Valence–Nîmes–Montpellier (–Béziers)
High-speed services (TGV) Paris–Lyon–Nîmes–Montpellier–Narbonne–Perpignan
High-speed service (TGV) Paris–Valence–Nîmes–Montpellier–Perpignan–Barcelona
Regional service (TER Occitanie) Narbonne–Béziers–Montpellier–Nîmes–Avignon
Regional service (TER Occitanie) Cerbère–Perpignan–Narbonne–Montpellier–Nîmes–Avignon
Regional service (TER Occitanie) Narbonne–Montpellier–Nîmes–Arles–Marseille

Gallery

References

Railway stations in Hérault
Railway stations in France opened in 1857